Poplar is a Docklands Light Railway (DLR) station in Poplar in London, England. Poplar is a cross-platform interchange station for three of the six lines on the DLR (-, Bank- and Tower Gateway-) making it one of the busiest stations on the network in terms of services. It is also nearby the Canary Wharf Station on Crossrail's Elizabeth Line.

History
Long before the opening of the DLR in 1987, there had been three stations with the name Poplar. However, none was on the site of the current station.
Poplar railway station was on the London and Blackwall Railway between 8 July 1840 to 4 May 1926. This is near the site of Blackwall DLR station.
Poplar (East India Dock Road) railway station on the North London Railway was in use from 1866 until 1944. This is now the site of All Saints DLR station.
 A third station named Poplar was constructed in 1851 but never opened. This was sited due south of the North London Railway station (now All Saints DLR), and due east of the present DLR depot.

Poplar DLR station was opened on 21 August 1987, originally with just two platforms, being served only by the Stratford-Island Gardens branch of the DLR. As the DLR was expanded eastwards, the station was extensively remodelled, given two extra platforms and expanded to take two-car operation. On 28 March 1994 Poplar became the western terminus of the new Beckton branch, which opened the same day; on 31 July 1995, the line was extended west, joining Poplar with Westferry via a flying junction and enabling Beckton services to run to Tower Gateway. Bank to King George V (later Woolwich Arsenal) services through the station commenced on 2 December 2005.

A trial as is part of Mayor of London Draft Transport Strategy called Adopt a Station' took place in 2018, which aims to encourage the use of public transport with space at the station will be given over to help publicise community events, classes, and workshops. It will also provide a platform for schools and groups to showcase art and it is hoped the scheme will make travelling through the station a more pleasant experience.

Location
Poplar serves a junction in four directions:
Eastbound towards Beckton and Woolwich Arsenal (next station Blackwall)
Northbound towards Stratford (next station All Saints)
Southbound towards the Isle of Dogs and Lewisham (next station West India Quay)
Westbound towards Bank and Tower Gateway (next station Westferry).

Poplar DLR depot is situated north of the station, and is accessed through a pair of tracks just east of Poplar. These feature the tightest curves in operation on the railway.

Connections
London Buses
While no bus routes directly serve the station presently, routes 15 and 115, prefix route D6 and night routes N15 and N551 do provide an indirect link to the station eastbound via Hale Street at Poplar Recreation Ground/Poplar Station bus stop on East India Dock Road A13.

Elizabeth Line
As part of the construction of the Elizabeth line, Canary Wharf railway station was built and opened in 2022. This enables interchange between DLR and Elizabeth line services.

See also
Poplar DLR depot

References

External links
Docklands Light Railway website – Poplar station page
Map of Poplar, 1885.
 Photograph of one of the platforms at Poplar

Docklands Light Railway stations in the London Borough of Tower Hamlets
Railway stations in Great Britain opened in 1987
DLR station